A cultural movement is a change in the way a number of different disciplines approach their work. This embodies all art forms, the sciences, and philosophies. Historically, different nations or regions of the world have gone through their own independent sequence of movements in culture, but as world communications have accelerated this geographical distinction has become less distinct. When cultural movements go through revolutions from one to the next, genres tend to get attacked and mixed up, and often new genres are generated and old ones fade.: These changes are often reactions against the prior cultural form, which typically has grown stale and repetitive. An obsession emerges among the mainstream with the new movement, and the old one falls into neglect – sometimes it dies out entirely, but often it chugs along favored in a few disciplines and occasionally making reappearances (sometimes prefixed with "neo-").

There is continual argument over the precise definition of each of these periods, and one historian might group them differently, or choose different names or descriptions. As well, even though in many cases the popular change from one to the next can be swift and sudden, the beginning and end of movements are somewhat subjective, as the movements did not spring fresh into existence out of the blue and did not come to an abrupt end and lose total support, as would be suggested by a date range. Thus use of the term "period" is somewhat deceptive. "Period" also suggests a linearity of development, whereas it has not been uncommon for two or more distinctive cultural approaches to be active at the same time. Historians will be able to find distinctive traces of a cultural movement before its accepted beginning, and there will always be new creations in old forms. So it can be more useful to think in terms of broad "movements" that have rough beginnings and endings. Yet for historical perspective, some rough date ranges will be provided for each to indicate the "height" or accepted time span of the movement.

This current article covers western, notably European and American cultural movements. They have, however, been paralleled by cultural movements in the Orient and elsewhere. In the late 20th and early 21st century in Thailand, for example, there has been a cultural shift away from western social and political values more toward Japanese and Chinese. As well, That culture has reinvigorated monarchical concepts to accommodate state shifts away from western ideology regarding democracy and monarchies.

Cultural movements
 Graeco-Roman
 The Greek culture marked a departure from the other Mediterranean cultures that preceded and surrounded it. The Romans adopted Greek and other styles, and spread the result throughout Europe and the Middle East. Together, Greek and Roman thought in philosophy, religion, science, history, and all forms of thought can be viewed as a central underpinning of Western culture, and is therefore termed the "Classical period" by some. Others might divide it into the Hellenistic period and the Roman period, or might choose other finer divisions.
 See: Classical architecture — Classical sculpture — Greek architecture — Hellenistic architecture — Ionic — Doric — Corinthian — Stoicism — Cynicism — Epicurean — Roman architecture — Early Christian — Neoplatonism
 Romanesque (11th century & 12th centuries)
 A style (esp. architectural) similar in form and materials to Roman styles. Romanesque seems to be the first pan-European style since Roman Imperial Architecture and examples are found in every part of the continent.
 See: Romanesque architecture — Ottonian Art
 Gothic (mid 12th century until mid 15th century)
 
 See: Gothic architecture — Gregorian chant — Neoplatonism
 Nominalism

 Rejects Platonic realism as a requirement for thinking and speaking in general terms.
 Humanism (16th century)

 Renaissance
 The use of light, shadow, and perspective to more accurately represent life. Because of how fundamentally these ideas were felt to alter so much of life, some have referred to it as the "Golden Age". In reality it was less an "Age" and more of a movement in popular philosophy, science, and thought that spread over Europe (and probably other parts of the world), over time, and affected different aspects of culture at different points in time. Very roughly, the following periods can be taken as indicative of place/time foci of the Renaissance: Italian Renaissance 1450–1550. Spanish Renaissance 1550–1587. English Renaissance 1588–1629.
 Protestant Reformation
 The Protestant Reformation, often referred to simply as the Reformation, was a schism from the Roman Catholic Church initiated by Martin Luther, John Calvin, Huldrych Zwingli and other early Protestant Reformers in the 16th century Europe.
 Mannerism
 Anti-classicist movement that sought to emphasize the feeling of the artist himself.
 See: Mannerism/Art
 Baroque
 Emphasizes power and authority, characterized by intricate detail and without the "disturbing angst" of Mannerism. Essentially is exaggerated Classicism to promote and glorify the Church and State. Occupied with notions of infinity.
 See: Baroque art — Baroque music
 Rococo
 Neoclassical (17th–19th centuries)
 Severe, unemotional movement recalling Roman and Greek ("classical") style, reacting against the overbred Rococo style and the emotional Baroque style. It stimulated revival of classical thinking, and had especially profound effects on science and politics. Also had a direct influence on Academic Art in the 19th century. Beginning in the early 17th century with Cartesian thought (see René Descartes), this movement provided philosophical frameworks for the natural sciences, sought to determine the principles of knowledge by rejecting all things previously believed to be known about the world. In Renaissance Classicism attempts are made to recreate the classic art forms — tragedy, comedy, and farce.
 See also: Weimar Classicism
Age of Enlightenment (1688–1789): Reason (rationalism) seen as the ideal.
 Romanticism (1770–1830)
 Began in Germany and spread to England and France as a reaction against Neoclassicism and against the Age of Enlightenment.. The notion of "folk genius", or an inborn and intuitive ability to do magnificent things, is a core principle of the Romantic movement. Nostalgia for the primitive past in preference to the scientifically minded present. Romantic heroes, exemplified by Napoleon, are popular. Fascination with the past leads to a resurrection of interest in the Gothic period. It did not really replace the Neoclassical movement so much as provide a counterbalance; many artists sought to join both styles in their works.
 See: Symbolism
 Realism (1830–1905)
 Ushered in by the Industrial Revolution and growing Nationalism in the world. Began in France. Attempts to portray the speech and mannerisms of everyday people in everyday life. Tends to focus on middle class social and domestic problems. Plays by Ibsen are an example. Naturalism evolved from Realism, following it briefly in art and more enduringly in theatre, film, and literature. Impressionism, based on 'scientific' knowledge and discoveries concerns observing nature and reality objectively.
 See: Post-impressionism — Neo-impressionism — Pointillism — Pre-Raphaelite
 Art Nouveau (1880–1905)
 Decorative, symbolic art
 See: Transcendentalism
 Modernism (1880–1965)
 Also known as the Avant-garde movement. Originating in the 19th century with Symbolism, the Modernist movement composed itself of a wide range of 'isms' that ran in contrast to Realism and that sought out the underlying fundamentals of art and philosophy. The Jazz age and Hollywood emerge and have their hey-days.
 See: Fauvism — Cubism — Futurism — Suprematism — Dada — Constructivism — Surrealism — Expressionism — Existentialism — Op art — Art Deco — Bauhaus — Neo-Plasticism — Precisionism — Abstract expressionism — New Realism — Color field painting — Happening — Fluxus — Hard-edge painting — Pop art — Photorealism — Minimalism — Postminimalism — Lyrical abstraction — Situationism
 Postmodernism (since c.1965)
 A reaction to Modernism, in a way, Postmodernism largely discards the notion that artists should seek pure fundamentals, often questioning whether such fundamentals even exist – or suggestion that if they do exist, they may be irrelevant. It is exemplified by movements such as deconstructivism, conceptual art, etc.
 See: Postmodern philosophy — Postmodern music — Postmodern art
 Post-postmodernism (since c.1990)

See also
 Art movement
 List of art movements
 Critical theory
 Cultural imperialism
 Cultural sensibility
 History of philosophy
 Postliterate society
 Periodization
 Social movement

External links
 Alphabetical list of some movements, styles, discoveries and facts on the World History Timeline chart

Culture
Social movements